Guy Bellis (1886–1980) was a British film actor.

Selected filmography
 Cardinal Richelieu (1935)
 Storm Over Bengal (1938)
 The Little Princess (1939)
 The Private Lives of Elizabeth and Essex (1939)
 The Sea Hawk (playing Captain Hawkins) (1940) 
 Dressed to Kill (1946)
 Pride of Maryland (1951)
 The Prisoner of Zenda (1952)

References

External links

1886 births
1980 deaths
English male film actors
20th-century English male actors
British expatriate male actors in the United States